Roppen is a municipality in the Imst district and is located 5 km southeast of Imst between the mouths of the Pitze River and the Ötztaler Ache. The village was mentioned in documents in 1260 for the first time as "Roupen" but settlement already began 3000 years ago.

Population

References

External links

Mieming Range
Cities and towns in Imst District